William Woods University is a private university in Fulton, Missouri. Founded in 1870, the university is accredited by the Higher Learning Commission. Expanding its mission to address the need for graduate and adult-oriented programs, the institution became known as William Woods University in 1993. It began offering graduate degrees and admitting men as well as women into all of its programs. It enrolled 1,681 students in 2021.

History 
First known as the Female Orphan School, the institution was founded in 1870 in Camden Point, Missouri in response to the needs of girls who were orphaned during the American Civil War.

During the late nineteenth century, the institution moved to Fulton and expanded its elementary and secondary programs to accommodate young women who aspired to become teachers. Known briefly at the beginning of the twentieth century as Daughters College, it changed its name to William Woods College in 1900 to honor a major benefactor (William S. Woods, president of the National Bank of Commerce) and began offering a two-year college program. In 1962, anticipating dramatic changes in the role of American women in the labor force, William Woods became a four-year college.

In 1952, future U.S. President Ronald Reagan gave a commencement address at the college in which he said that he "always thought of America as a place in the divine scheme of things that was set aside as a promised land."  This is also a notable speech by the future President as it is one of his oldest surviving speeches.

In 1992, William Woods College changed its name to William Woods University, and began offering a wide variety of graduate-level degree programs, geared toward the working adult. The university went co-education by accepting male students on campus in 1997.

Campus 

The campus in Fulton includes buildings of various types. Two favorites of the campus community are Dulany Auditorium and the William S. Woods Academic Building.

Dulany Auditorium was built in 1907. Mrs. D.M. Dulany contributed $7,500 toward construction of the $24,000 building in memory of her husband. The stained glass portrait windows are of D.M. Dulany, W.H. Dulany and Benjamin L. Locke, all early supporters of the college.

The William S. Woods Academic Building, or the Academic Building, as most students refer to it, is a three-story brick structure which houses administrative offices, classrooms and faculty. It was completed in 1921.

Rosa Parks Center 
Rosa Parks Center, a Missouri Division of Youth Services (DYS) center for incarcerated girls, is a former university dormitory at WWU.  It holds 10-12 girls at a time. WWU students are involved with the center. DYS and WWU agreed to the joint project in 2000, and the center opened in January 2001.

Outreach program permanent sites 
WWU offers graduate degree programs, degree completion programs, and select undergraduate programs at permanent sites in Fulton, Columbia, and Blue Springs, as well as temporary sites across Missouri.

Student life 
The university has approximately 600 undergraduate students from all over the U.S. and numerous other countries.

William Woods offers approximately 40 student organizations, including co-curricular, honorary, religious/faith-based, service/leadership, and social/academic/special interest groups.

Counseling and Health Services provides students with physical health related services as well as counseling/mental health related services.

Safety officers work to provide a safe and orderly campus environment.

Greek life 
William Woods is home to three fraternities, Pi Kappa Alpha, Phi Gamma Delta, and Sigma Tau Gamma, and four sororities, Alpha Chi Omega, Alpha Phi, Chi Omega, and Delta Gamma.

Athletics 
The William Woods athletic teams are called the Owls. The university is a member of the National Association of Intercollegiate Athletics (NAIA), primarily competing in the American Midwest Conference (AMC) since the 1993–94 academic year.

William Woods compete in 19 intercollegiate varsity sports: Men's sports include baseball, basketball, bowling, cross country, golf, soccer, tennis and track & field; while women's sports include basketball, bowling, cross country, golf, soccer, softball, tennis, track & field and volleyball; and co-ed sports include cheerleading and outdoor life sports.

Alumni and traditions 
William Woods has more than 25,000 alumni. There are many traditions associated with the school, including the "Ivy Chain." The Ivy Ceremony marks the start of the students' college life. When they graduate, the ivy will be cut during another ceremony, held at commencement, symbolizing separation from college and the beginning of a new life. The tradition is believed to have begun more than a hundred years ago when the Class of 1899 planted ivy on the campus during a special graduation ceremony.

Notable alumni 
 Luann Ridgeway, member of the Missouri State Senate
 Helen Stephens, Olympic gold medalist, Berlin

References

External links 
 
 Official athletics website

 
Universities and colleges affiliated with the Christian Church (Disciples of Christ)
Educational institutions established in 1870
Buildings and structures in Callaway County, Missouri
Private universities and colleges in Missouri
Education in Callaway County, Missouri
1870 establishments in Missouri